Francis Joseph Howard (1 August 1923 – 24 August 2007) was an Australian rules footballer who played with Richmond in the Victorian Football League (VFL).

Notes

External links 

1923 births
2007 deaths
Australian rules footballers from Victoria (Australia)
Richmond Football Club players